Captain Charles Robert George Innes-Ker, 11th Duke of Roxburghe (born 18 February 1981), also known as Charles Innes or Charlie Roxburghe, is a British aristocrat and soldier.

Biography
Captain Charles Robert George Innes-Ker is the 11th Duke of Roxburghe. He is the eldest son of the 10th Duke of Roxburghe and his first wife, the former Lady Jane Meriel Grosvenor, daughter of the 5th Duke of Westminster. His uncle was Gerald Grosvenor, 6th Duke of Westminster. He was educated at Eton College and the University of Newcastle upon Tyne. He attended the Royal Military Academy Sandhurst, passed out in December 2004, and has served with the Blues and Royals in Windsor and Iraq. Prior to succeeding to the dukedom on his father's death in August 2019, he was styled Marquess of Bowmont and Cessford.

On his accession to the dukedom, he inherited Floors Castle and 60,000 acres around the Cheviot Hills and the River Tweed as well as hotels in the area, with an estimated wealth of up to £100 million. In February 2003, he was caught travelling on the Tyne and Wear Metro without paying the £1 fare. He chose to pay a £10 fine rather than take the case to court and risk appearing on "losers' posters" displayed around the city, naming people who had been caught travelling without tickets.

Personal life
On 22 July 2011, he married The Honourable Charlotte Susanna Aitken (b. 15 February 1982), elder daughter of Maxwell Aitken, 3rd Baron Beaverbrook. The couple separated and sued for divorce in June 2012, less than a year after the wedding. In 2015, he had a daughter with fashion designer Morvarid Sahafi. On 30 January 2021, his engagement to Annabel Green was announced and they married in September 2021 at Floors Castle. Annabel became upon marriage The Duchess of Roxburghe.

Chiefship of Clan Innes 
The previous Duke of Roxburghe was heir to the chiefship of the Clan Innes (Clann Innis, not Mac Aonghuis or Clan MacInnes); however, since he bears the surname Innes-Ker, the Lord Lyon King of Arms will not recognise him as chief of the name Innes.

References

Bowmont, Charles Innes-Ker, Marquess of
Bowmont, Charles Innes-Ker, Marquess of
British people of American descent
1981 births
Living people
Blues and Royals officers
British Army personnel of the Iraq War
11
Graduates of the Royal Military Academy Sandhurst
Goelet family